William Norman Grigg (February 4, 1963 – April 12, 2017) was an American author of several books from a constitutionalist perspective. He was formerly a senior editor of The New American magazine, the official publication of the John Birch Society.

Biography
Born in Burley, Idaho, Grigg graduated from Utah State University, majoring in political science. He served as Provo Daily Herald columnist and Washington journalist before "seeing the light" and starting work in 1993 as a correspondent, researcher, and senior editor for The New American, the official biweekly magazine of the John Birch Society (JBS). Based at the JBS's office in Appleton, Wisconsin, Grigg covered United Nations summits and conferences from 1994 to 2001, and wrote Freedom on the Altar (1995), a study of UN family policy.

Associate Kevin Bearly, a minister and former police officer, conducted JBS summer youth camps in the 1990s at which Grigg and others promoted conservative causes. Grigg has also spoken frequently on conspiracies and Clinton impeachment in Las Vegas, Colorado Springs, and Salt Lake City. Grigg was associate director for Activate Congress To Improve Our Nation (ACTION), a committee incorporated by JBS to promote the impeachment of President Bill Clinton, with chapters in 50 states.

In 2005, Grigg called for the resignation of the JBS president and CEO, G. Vance Smith, who had promoted two sons to leadership positions; Smith was narrowly deposed in a September 2005 Board of Incorporators vote. The new CEO, Arthur R. Thompson, and other leaders initiated a staff blog to which Grigg contributed heavily.

Grigg formed a personal blog, "Pro Libertate", in August 2006, saying that JBS leadership had deleted some of his posts from their blog, such as a June comparison of immigration debate to professional wrestling. He stated that he was fired by JBS on October 3, 2006, officially for unstated reasons.

Views
Grigg's writing reflects views heavily influenced by constitutionalism, libertarianism, and anti-communism. Ward Churchill favorably quoted Grigg's observation that totalitarianism is defined by abundance and unintelligibility of laws.

The new JBS leadership launched the U.S. immigration issue as a major campaign in 2005. Grigg, of Hawaiian/Cherokee/Basque/Irish descent, had often in JBS publications called for controls on immigration. His New American article "Revolution in America", a study of immigration problems and issues, was reprinted for its "current and incisive" rhetorical qualities by a McGraw-Hill college text. Grigg has promoted the concept that "white Leninists" desired to send "millions of Mexicans across the border with the idea of having each kill 10 Americans".

But by 2006 Grigg had decided that the immigration issue had been overplayed by the Republican Party as a driving cause to keep big-government, pro-war Republicans in control of the U.S. Congress. He argued that an attack on personal liberties by the George W. Bush administration and the Republican Party was a more serious impediment to personal liberty, charging the administration with committing torture, detention without trial, warrantless surveillance, and wars of empire. Grigg considered a "wave" of media attention on immigration to be "nothing more than the swirl in the bowl after the chain has been pulled" on the Republican Party.

Grigg was a critic of neoconservatism and considered foreign aid to be a tool of US imperialism.

Welch Foundation
The Robert W. Welch Foundation (Right Source Online), founded in 1997 by former California JBS members, adopted Grigg's Pro Libertate blog and made him a weekly cohost (December 30, 2005 – May 4, 2007) on the nationally syndicated afternoon radio show "The Right Source" with Kevin Shannon (Bearly's pseudonym). It also launched the Pro Libertate e-zine, where Grigg brought in writers such as James Bovard and fellow LewRockwell.com columnist Scott Horton. It commissioned Grigg's 2007 book alleging Bush and Clinton attacks on liberty, Liberty In Eclipse.

Other activities
Grigg has recorded the radio spot "A Liberty Minute" weekdays since February 19, 2007, which, since July 2, has used the tagline, "Let us take back the liberty wherewith Christ has made us free" (Galatians 5:1).

Grigg was also a studio and live musician who served as lead guitarist in the Wisconsin band Slick Willie and the Calzones, until his 2005 move to Idaho. The band's 2001 CD, Green and Gold, featured rock, country, and jazz homages to the Green Bay Packers, such as the novelty song "Tailgate Polka".

He and his wife had six children.

Death
Will Grigg died of a heart attack on April 12, 2017.

Books

References

External links
 Will Grigg's Liberty Minutes
 Pro Libertate blog
 Pro Libertate e-zine
 Archives on LewRockwell.com
 Notes on the Jerry Seinfeld Society
 Bio  at The John Birch Society
 William Grigg  at The American View Forum

1963 births
2017 deaths
20th-century American guitarists
20th-century American journalists
20th-century American male writers
20th-century American non-fiction writers
20th-century American male musicians
21st-century American journalists
21st-century American male writers
21st-century American non-fiction writers
American columnists
American foreign policy writers
American rock guitarists
American libertarians
American male guitarists
American male journalists
American male non-fiction writers
American political journalists
American political writers
American writers of Mexican descent
Christian libertarians
Critics of neoconservatism
Former Latter Day Saints
Hispanic and Latino American journalists
John Birch Society
Journalists from Idaho
Non-interventionism
American opinion journalists
People from Burley, Idaho
People from Payette, Idaho
Utah State University alumni
Writers from Idaho